

Mackerel is an important food fish that is consumed worldwide. As an oily fish, it is a rich source of omega-3 fatty acids. The flesh of mackerel spoils quickly, especially in the tropics, and can cause scombroid food poisoning. Accordingly, it should be eaten on the day of capture, unless properly refrigerated or cured.

Preservation
Mackerel preservation is not simple. Before the 19th-century development of canning and the widespread availability of refrigeration, salting and smoking were the principal preservation methods available. Historically in England, this fish was not preserved, but was consumed only in its fresh form. However, spoilage was common, leading the authors of The Cambridge Economic History of Europe to remark: "There are more references to stinking mackerel in English literature than to any other fish!" In France mackerel was traditionally pickled with large amounts of salt, which allowed it to be sold widely across the country.

In Japan mackerel is commonly cured with salt and vinegar to make a type of sushi known as saba-zushi. Historically saba-zushi originated in Kyoto as a solution for transporting mackerel to the inland city, which otherwise would not have made the journey from the coast still fresh. The road linking Obama bay and Kyoto is now also called "mackerel road" (saba-kaido).

Popularity
For many years mackerel was regarded as unclean in the UK and elsewhere due to folklore which suggested that the fish fed on the corpses of dead sailors. A 1976 survey of housewives in Britain undertaken by the White Fish Authority indicated a reluctance to departing from buying the traditional staples of cod, haddock or salmon. Less than 10% of the surveys 1,931 respondents had ever bought mackerel and only 3% did so regularly. As a result of this trend many UK fishmongers during the 1970s did not display or even stock mackerel.

Mercury
There is a large variation in the mercury levels found in mackerel. These levels differ markedly for different species, and even for the same species in different locations; however, the strongest positive correlation seems to be connected to the species' size (the larger species being higher on the food chain). According to the United States Food and Drug Administration, king mackerel is one of four fishes, along with swordfish, shark, and tilefish, that children and pregnant women should avoid due to high levels of methylmercury found in these fish and the consequent risk of mercury poisoning.

Gallery

References

Citations

Sources 

 Keay JN (2001) Handling and processing mackerel Torry advisory note 66.

External links

 Mackerel nutrition facts
 

Scombridae
Mackerels
Oily fish
Commercial fish